The British Sports Journalism Awards are given annually in a number of categories. The category "Sports Newspaper of the Year" has been awarded since 2010.

Sports Newspaper of the Year winners 

 2018: tbc
 2017: The Guardian
 2016: The Daily Mail
 2015: The Daily Mail
 2014: The Daily Mail
 2013: The Daily Mail
 2012: The Times
 2011: The Times
 2010: The Times

References 

British journalism awards